This is a List of Formula 3 Euro Series drivers, that is, a list of drivers who have made at least one race start in the Formula 3 Euro Series. Drivers of Trophy that held in 2006 are not included. This list is accurate up to the end of the 2012 season.

By name

By license

Footnotes

References

Formula 3 Euro Series
Formula Three Euro Series drivers